Bob Hewitt and Frew McMillan were the defending champions but lost in the quarterfinals to Marty Riessen and Sherwood Stewart.

Bob Lutz and Stan Smith won in the final 1–6, 7–5, 6–3 against Marty Riessen and Sherwood Stewart.

Seeds

Draw

Finals

Top half

Section 1

Section 2

Bottom half

Section 3

Section 4

References

External links
 ATP main draw
1978 US Open – Men's draws and results at the International Tennis Federation

Men's doubles
US Open (tennis) by year – Men's doubles